Aberdeenshire RFC is a rugby union club based in Woodside, Aberdeen, Scotland. The Womens team currently plays in Caledonia North Regional League Division 1.

History
Aberdeenshire RFC was founded in 1875.

Aberdeenshire were early pioneers of Youth Rugby in the North East of Scotland. They were the first club in the area to establish a youth rugby team, in the 1960s.

The club has played in local and national level league structures, and has had up to three mens teams competing. The highest league position they have reached is National Two. They experienced a drop down the leagues in 2017 following some managerial and financial difficulties. They have since recovered; so much so that they were nominated for Aberdeen Sports Club of the year in 2019, after winning the treble that season. This consisted of; winning the league, winning the regional bowl competition, and winning the national bowl competition with the final match held at Murrayfield.

Sides
The club runs a men's side, a women's side known as Aberdeenshire Quines, a mixed touch rugby side known as Aberdeenshire Leopards.

Aberdeenshire Sevens
The club runs the Aberdeenshire Sevens tournament. Sides play for the W. Wilson Robertson Trophy.

Honours
 Caledonia North League Three
 Champions (1): 2018-19
 Caledonia North Bowl Competition
 Champions (1): 2018-19
 National Bowl Competition
 Champions (1): 2018-19
 Dundee HSFP Sevens
 Champions (1): 1906
 Orkney Sevens
 Champions (1): 1975
 Caithness Sevens
 Champions (1): 1977
 Garioch Sevens
 Champions (3): 1978, 1991, 2016
 Banff Sevens
 Champions (2): 1999, 2015

Notable former players

Scotland
The following former Aberdeenshire players have represented Scotland at international level.

North and Midlands
The following former Aberdeenshire players have represented North and Midlands at provincial level.

Former rugby commentator Bill McLaren also played for the club.

References

Rugby union in Aberdeen
Scottish rugby union teams